Umberto is a masculine Italian given name. It is the Italian form of Humbert. People with the name include:

 King Umberto I of Italy (1844–1900)
 King Umberto II of Italy (1904–1983)
 Prince Umberto, Count of Salemi (1889–1918)
 Umberto I, Count of Savoy (980 – 1047 or 1048)
 Umberto II, Count of Savoy (1065–1103)
 Umberto III, Count of Savoy (1135–1189)
 Umberto Bassignani (1878–1944), Italian sculptor
 Umberto Boccioni (1882–1916), Italian artist and sculptor
 Umberto Calzolari (1938–2018), Italian baseball player
 Umberto Colombo (1927–2006), Italian scientist
 Umberto De Morpurgo (1896–1961), Italian tennis player
 Umberto Eco (1932–2016), Italian writer
 Umberto Giordano (1867–1948), Italian composer
 Umberto Meoli (1920–2002), Italian economic historian
 Umberto Merlin (1885–1964), Italian lawyer and politician 
 Umberto Nobile (1885–1978), Italian pilot and explorer
 Umberto Panerai (born 1953), Italian water polo player 
 Umberto Ricci (1879–1946), Italian academic and economist 
 Umberto Tozzi (born 1952), Italian singer and musician

See also
 Umberto D., a 1952 Italian film directed by Vittorio De Sica
 Humbert
 Umbertina, a 1979 novel by Helen Barolini

Italian masculine given names
Italian names of Germanic origin

nl:Umberto